Brant David Daugherty (born August 20, 1985) is an American actor, known for his recurring role as Noel Kahn on the teen drama television series Pretty Little Liars. In 2013, he had a recurring role as Brian in the NBC daytime drama Days of Our Lives.

Career
In 2013, he was a regular of the cast of Lifetime Network's Army Wives for season 7, which began airing in April 2013, in the role of Patrick Clarke.

He had a credited role in Jason Friedberg and Aaron Seltzer's motion picture comedy film The Starving Games released in fall 2013.

In 2014, he had a credited role in the Charlie Sheen FX series Anger Management.

Daugherty was a contestant in season 17 of Dancing with the Stars in which he partnered with professional dancer Peta Murgatroyd. They were eliminated in the eighth week of competition, finishing in seventh place.

In 2018, he played Luke Sawyer in the film Fifty Shades Freed.

Personal life
Daugherty was born and raised in Mason, Ohio, the son of David Daugherty, an art teacher at Mason Middle School, and his wife, Mary Beth (née Hirt) Daugherty, head of rehabilitation services for Shriners Hospitals for Children, Cincinnati. He grew up along with his brother, Adam, and sister, Caitey. Brant's father died of cancer on February 19, 2009, at age 57.

Daugherty attended William Mason High School, where he played football until his sophomore year and later tried out for the school play. He continued to perform in school plays until his graduation in 2004. He moved to Los Angeles in 2008 after earning a film degree from Columbia College Chicago. He now resides in West Hollywood.

He started dating actress Kimberly Hidalgo in 2016. They got engaged in February 2018 during a trip to Amsterdam and they married on June 15, 2019. In December 2020, the couple announced that they were expecting their first child. Their son was born in March 2021.

Filmography

Film

Television

Web

References

External links
 
 
 

1985 births
21st-century American male actors
American male film actors
American male soap opera actors
American male television actors
Living people
Male actors from Ohio
People from Mason, Ohio